Endotricha consobrinalis is a species of snout moth in the genus Endotricha. It was described by Philipp Christoph Zeller in 1852. It is found in Africa and the Middle East.

Subspecies
 Endotricha consobrinalis consobrinalis (western Africa to southern Africa to eastern Africa as well as Palestine and Jordan)
 Endotricha consobrinalis meloui Whalley, 1963 (Madagascar)

References

External links
 Swedish Museum of Natural History - images of type

Endotrichini
Moths described in 1852
Moths of Africa
Moths of Asia
Moths of Madagascar
Taxa named by Philipp Christoph Zeller